is the seventh single by Japanese music trio Candies. Written by Kazuya Senke and Yūsuke Hoguchi, the single was released on September 1, 1975.

The song peaked at No. 17 on Oricon's singles chart and sold over 103,000 copies.

Track listing 
All lyrics are written by Kazuya Senke; all music is written and arranged by Yūsuke Hoguchi.

Chart positions

Cover versions 
 In 1977, Singaporean boy band Black Dog Bone covered this song in Malaysian as "Hilang Rindu Bila Bertemu", with Malaysian translation by Haron Abdulmajid.

References

External links 
 
 

1975 singles
1975 songs
Japanese-language songs
Candies (group) songs
Sony Music Entertainment Japan singles